Ken Malamin Jammeh (born November 18, 1987) is a Gambian former footballer.

References

External links

1987 births
Living people
Gambian footballers
The Gambia youth international footballers
Gambian expatriate footballers
Association football midfielders
Hakoah Maccabi Amidar Ramat Gan F.C. players
Israeli Premier League players
Expatriate footballers in Israel
Expatriate footballers in Finland
Gambian expatriate sportspeople in Israel